Municipio XIII is an administrative subdivision of the city of Rome. It was first created by Rome's City Council on 19 January 2001 and it has a president who is elected during the mayoral elections.

Originally called Municipio XVIII, since 11 March 2013 its borders were modified and its name changed in Municipio XIII.

Subdivision
Municipio XIII is divided in six urbanisms zones:

Politics
Current allocation of seats in the Municipio XIII's parliamentary body as of the 2013 Rome municipal election: 
Democratic Party (PD) 13
People of Freedom (PdL) 5
Left Ecology Freedom 2
Five Star Movement (M5S) 2
Others 2
In May 2013 Valentino Mancinelli (PD) was elected president. The current majority is formed by Democratic Party and Left Ecology Freedom.

References

External links

Municipi of Rome
Ostia (Rome)